Orconectes australis, the southern cave crayfish, is a species of crayfish in the family Cambaridae found in Alabama and Tennessee. Ages of 176 years have been claimed for O. australis, though this was reduced to ≤22 years in a 2012 study.

References

Cambaridae
Freshwater crustaceans of North America
Crustaceans described in 1941
Cave crayfish